Alen Kjosevski (born 7 June 2001) is a Macedonian handball player who plays for RK Vardar 1961.

Honors 
 Macedonian Handball Super League
 Winner: 2022
 Macedonian Handball Cup
 Winner: 2022

References
https://24rakomet.mk/%d0%b2%d0%b0%d1%80%d0%b4%d0%b0%d1%80-%d0%b8%d0%bc%d0%b0-%d0%b8-%d1%82%d1%80%d0%b5%d1%82%d0%be-%d0%b4%d0%b5%d1%81%d0%bd%d0%be-%d0%ba%d1%80%d0%b8%d0%bb%d0%be-%d0%bf%d0%be%d1%82%d0%bf%d0%b8%d1%88%d0%b0/

2001 births
Living people
Macedonian male handball players
Sportspeople from Bitola